Next (Hangul: 넥스트 ； stylized as NEXT) is a Chinese boy group signed to Yuehua Entertainment. The group consists of five members: Zhu Zhengting, Bi Wenjun, Huang Xinchun, Fan Chengcheng, and Huang "Justin" Minghao. They debuted on June 21, 2018, with the song "Wait a Minute" and officially debuted as NEXT on November 8, 2019, with the song "WYTB".

History

Pre-debut
Prior to debuting, members Zhu Zhengting and Justin took part in Korea's Produce 101 and gained international attention. As Yuehua Entertainment trainees, all members competed in China's Idol Producer, making it into the final project group Nine Percent.

Debut
The group debuted on June 21, 2018, with the EP, The First, and its lead single "Wait a Minute". Their second EP, The First II, was released on July 18 followed by their third EP, The First III, on August 17. The group's first studio album, Next To You, was released on December 7.

2019: Official debut as NEXT
On November 8, 2019, the group officially debuted as NEXT (乐华NEXT) while also releasing their fourth EP, Next Begins. Fan Chengcheng was missing in this comeback due to schedule conflicts and is still in the group.

2020: My Love
On September 29, 2020, the group released a new single entitled "My Love". On October 9, an animated music video was released to accompany it.

Members
 Zhu Zhengting (朱正廷)
 Bi Wenjun (毕雯珺)
 Huang Xinchun (黄新淳)
 Fan Chengcheng (范丞丞)
 Justin (黄明昊)
 Ding Zeren (丁泽仁）

Discography

Studio albums

Extended plays

Soundtrack appearances

References

Chinese boy bands
Mandopop musical groups
Chinese pop music groups
Musical groups established in 2018
2018 establishments in China
Yuehua Entertainment artists
Idol Producer contestants